Hinch may refer to:

Hinch (surname)
Hinch, Missouri, US
Hinch, West Virginia, US